Summerside-South Drive is a provincial electoral district for the Legislative Assembly of Prince Edward Island, Canada.

Members
The riding has elected the following Members of the Legislative Assembly:

Election results

References

Prince Edward Island provincial electoral districts
Politics of Summerside, Prince Edward Island